Beryllophantis cochlias is a species of moth of the family Tortricidae. It is found in Papua New Guinea and West Irian. The habitat consists of montane rain-forests.

The wingspan is 13–16 mm for males and 14–17 mm for females. The forewings are pale greenish, with vivid green spots. The costa is creamy, with dark fuscous dots, followed below by vivid green suffusion. There is a conspicuous vivid green patch in the centre of the wing, edged above and below by a tuft of dark fuscous, raised scales. There is also a pale creamy dorsal streak. The hindwings are silvery white, with distal half distinctly striped greyish brown across the wing.

References

Moths described in 1938
Tortricini
Taxa named by Edward Meyrick